The Holywell branch line was a railway branch line in North Wales that connected Holywell with the North Wales Coast Line at Holywell Junction. Holywell had quite a large amount of mineral resources and the branch line was built originally as a mineral railway. When the local industry declined, the line fell into disuse, but it was reopened as a tourist passenger line in 1912. Road competition made the railway non-viable and this then cauded the line to be closed in 1954.

Origin
The Chester and Holyhead Railway built a line along the North Wales Coast; the objective was to connect the port of Holyhead with London, by connecting with other railway companies. This would enable the Irish mail, chiefly at the time government dispatches, to be conveyed.

The C&HR opened its line as far west as Bangor in 1848, and it opened the entire line throughout after completion of the Britannia Tubular Bridge, in 1850. A station named Holywell was opened on the eastern part of the line on 1 May 1848. However the town it served was  miles away, at an elevation of 550 feet.

The significance of Holywell was that there were extensive deposits of metal ores, coal and limestone, which together enabled the production of metals. Textiles were also produced locally. By 1850 the local industry had become of prime importance. Holywell had used a small harbour as its main export route, with a tramway to reach it from the town.

Opening
On 29 July 1864 the Holywell Railway was authorised by Parliament; it was to be two miles in length, running from the town to a new harbour, and crossing the Chester to Holyhead line (now transferred to the ownership of the London and North Western Railway) by a bridge, instead of the former level crossing.

The line was substantially completed by June 1867, and the former level crossing was removed. The new line conveyed minerals only, and operated for a decade before falling into disuse in the 1870s, when cheaper ores became available in South Wales and elsewhere, making the local industry uneconomic.

Acquisition by the LNWR, and reopening
After three decades of dereliction, the Holywell Railway was purchased by the London and North Western Railway company. Whatever the motivation was for the purchase, nothing was done with the acquired railway for some time, although conversion to an electric tramway in the twentieth century was considered. The LNWR had itself operated road omnibuses between Holywell main line station and the town from 11 October 1905, and the commercial success of that service encouraged the LNWR to redevelop the railway.

Authorising Acts of 1906 and 1907 permitted the regeneration, and a connecting spur to the Chester – Holyhead main line. Although the new line was only  miles in extent, it was not until 1 July 1912 that the reopening took place, to passengers and freight.

The ruling gradient was 1 in 27; there was a single intermediate station called St Winifride's, and Holywell station on the main line was redesignated Holywell Junction. The Holywell terminus was named Holywell Town.

Train service
The passenger rolling stock consisted of two former picnic saloons, converted to form an auto-train. At first there were sixteen passenger train journeys each way on weekdays, and this was increased to 29 each way before 1939. The summer 1938 Bradshaw shows 26 Monday to Friday departures up the branch, from 06:25 to 23:30. A similar number ran on Saturdays.

Closure
After 1945 the competition from road transport led to the rapid decline of the usage of the branch, and it was closed on 6 September 1954, except for a stub to Crescent Textile Mills, which continued in use until 11 August 1957. Holywell Junction station on the main line remained in use under that name until closure in February 1966.

Location list

  (station on main line named Holywell; opened 1 May 1848; renamed Holywell Junction 1912; closed 14 February 1966;
 ; opened 1 July 1912; closed 6 September 1954;
  (opened 1 July 1912; closed 6 September 1954.

Notes

References

External links

Holywell Junction on Disused Stations which includes a line history
Complete line on a 1952 navigable O.S. map

Closed railway lines in Wales
Transport in Flintshire
Railway lines opened in 1912
Standard gauge railways in Wales
1912 establishments in Wales